Illya Viktorovych Chuyev (born March 31, 1984 in Zaporizhia) is a Ukrainian swimmer, who specialized in butterfly events. Chuyev qualified for the men's 200 m butterfly at the 2012 Summer Olympics in London, by clearing a FINA B-standard entry time of 1:58.88 from the Ukrainian Summer Cup in Kharkiv. He challenged seven other swimmers on the second heat, including former semifinalist Hsu Chi-chieh of the Chinese Taipei. Chuyev edged out Romania's Alexandru Coci to notch a fourth spot by two hundredths of a second (0.02) in 1:59.65. Chuyev failed to advance into the semifinals, as he placed twenty-eighth overall in the preliminaries.

References

External links
NBC Olympics Profile

1984 births
Living people
Ukrainian male butterfly swimmers
Olympic swimmers of Ukraine
Swimmers at the 2012 Summer Olympics
Sportspeople from Zaporizhzhia
21st-century Ukrainian people